Francesco Furini (c. 1600 (or 1603) – August 19, 1646) was an Italian Baroque painter of Florence, noted for his sensual sfumato style in paintings of both secular and religious subjects.

Biography

He was born in Florence to an artistic family. His father, Filippo, was a portrait painter; his sister Alessandra also became a painter; and another sister, Angelica, was a singer in the court of Cosimo II de' Medici, Grand Duke of Tuscany. Furini's early training was by Matteo Rosselli (whose other pupils include Lorenzo Lippi and Baldassare Franceschini), though Furini is also described as influenced by Domenico Passignano and Giovanni Biliverti. He befriended Giovanni da San Giovanni. Traveling to Rome in 1619, he also would have been exposed to the influence of Caravaggio and his followers. Among his pupils are Simone Pignoni and Giovanni Battista Galestruzzi.

Furini's work reflects the tension faced by the conservative, mannerist style of Florence when confronting then novel Baroque styles. He is a painter of biblical and mythological set-pieces with a strong use of the misty sfumato technique. In the 1630s his style paralleled that of Guido Reni. An important early work, Hylas and the Nymphs (1630), features six female nudes that attest to the importance Furini placed upon drawing from life.

Furini became a priest in 1633 for the parish of Sant'Ansano in Mugello.

Freedberg describes Furini's style as filled with "morbid sensuality". His frequent use of disrobed females is discordant with his excessive religious sentimentality, and his polished stylization and poses are at odds with his aim of expressing highly emotional states. His stylistic choices did not go unnoticed by more puritanical contemporary biographers like Baldinucci. Pignoni also mirrored this style in his works.

One of his masterpieces, and not reflective of the style of his canvases, is the airy fresco in Palazzo Pitti, where on order of Ferdinando II de' Medici, between 1639 and 1642, Furini frescoed two large lunettes depicting the Platonic Academy of Careggi and the Allegory of the Death of Lorenzo the Magnificent. The frescoes can be seen as a response to Pietro da Cortona, who was at work in the palazzo during these years.

Furini traveled to Rome again in the year before his death in 1646.

Legacy
In Robert Browning's series of poems titled Parleyings with certain people of importance in their day, the poet envisions an explanation by Furini that refutes the published assertion by Filippo Baldinucci that (on his deathbed) he had ordered all his nude paintings be destroyed. For Browning, Furini's disrobement of his subjects is emblematic of a courageous search for the hidden truth. Modern research has demonstrated that Furini did not abandon his sensual painting subjects on entering the priesthood.

References

Sources
Campbell, Malcolm (1972). "Francesco Furini Drawings at the Uffizi". The Burlington Magazine, 114 (833), 571–570.
Cantelli, G., & Furini, F. (1972). Disegni di Francesco Furini: e del suo ambiente. Firenze: Olschki. 
Cappelletti, Francesca. "Furini, Francesco." Grove Art Online. Oxford Art Online. Oxford University Press,

Langmuir, Erika (2008). "Francesco Furini. Florence". The Burlington Magazine'', 150 (1263), 431–433. 
Web Gallery of Art entry.

External links

1600s births
1646 deaths
17th-century Italian painters
Italian male painters
Painters from Florence
Italian Baroque painters